Crosswort is a common name for several species of plants and may refer to:

 Crucianella stylosa (Rubiaceae)
 Cruciata laevipes  (Rubiaceae)
 Lysimachia quadrifolia (Primulaceae, formerly Myrsinaceae), native to the eastern United States and Canada